Mortara (Lombard: Murtära) is a town and comune in the region of Lombardy, Italy.  It lies between the Agogna and Terdoppio rivers, in the historical district known as Lomellina, a rice-growing agricultural center. It received the honorary title of city with a royal decree in 1706.

History
The town has Roman origins proved by several archaeological discoveries and its first name was Pulchra Silva. After the bloody battle during which Charlemagne defeated the Longobard King Desiderius in 773, its name changed. In the Orlando Furioso (second canto) it can be read: 
Quivi cader de’ Longobardi tanti,e tanta fu quivi la strage loro,che ‘l loco de la pugna gli abitantiMortara dapoi sempre nominoro.Ludovico Ariosto, I cinque canti - canto II, 88

The prose translation sounds as follows:"Here so many Longobards died and the slaughter of them was so great here that, from then on, the inhabitants gave the place of the battle the name of Mortara".

It prospered as a hunting place of pastimes thanks to Gian Galeazzo Visconti, who decreed unsuccessfully to change its name into Beldiporto (1384). It was transformed by Charles V into a fortress called «The Star» and in 1658 was besieged by the French-Piedmontese Army led by Francesco d'Este. It was restituted to Spain and remained a Spanish possession until 1706, when it was annexed to the Savoy Kingdom. In the same year it became the capital of the Province of Lomellina. On March 21, 1849 it was the site of a bloody Austro-Piedmontese battle just before the defeat of Novara.

Mortara is now an agricultural center of national importance for its rice production, but it is also an interesting and tasty gastronomical destination thanks to the goose sausages and products.

Main sights

San Lorenzo, Mortara:  Gothic basilica with brick façade, was built (1375-1380) by Bartolino da Novara and renovated in 1840 and 1916. Two 15th-century tondoes are found outside the main entrance. The pilaster strips depict SS. Albin, Amìcus and Amelius; these are 19th-century copies of a 15th-century polyptych by Paolo da Brescia, previously found in the Church of St Albin and now conserved in Sabauda Gallery. Inside the church, to the right of the entrance, in the first span is a 15th-century fresco depicting the Virgin with Her Child; in the 2nd span Virgin between Saints Roch and Sebastian (1524) attributed to Gaudenzio Ferrari. In the first chapel is housed a panel by Bernardo Lanino, dated 1578 and representing The Lady of the Rosary crowned by 15 tablets by the same author illustrating the fifteen mysteries of the Rosary. The niche is completed by four canvasses by G. C. Procaccini representing the Archangel and Our Lady of the Annunciation, The Escape from Egypt and The rest of the Holy Family, in addition to a Glory in Paradise attributed to Camillo Procaccini. In the second chapel, above the altar, is a Crucifixion with Ss. Ambrogius, Laurentius and Mary the Magdalen (1610) by Giovanni Battista Crespi (il Cerano). Left aisle, first chapel - Here we can find a magnificent wooden Christmas crib with about 80 low relieved figures (beginnings of the fifteenth century) by Lorenzo da Mortara. A St Charles in prayer and Ste Anne with Virgin attributed to Morazzone. Second chapel - There is the fifteenth-century polyptych on a six-parted table, a work by A. De Munini.
Santa Croce: founded in 1080, outside the walls under the patronage of Pope Gregorius VII; after town expanded, rebuilt by Tibaldi in 1596. Repairs in 1960s altered decoration. In the pilaster strip dividing 1st and 2nd chapels is an indentation in Carrara marble said to be a footprint of the Christ retrieved from the Holy Land during the Crusades. The 3rd chapel on the right hosts a Adoration of the Magi (1533) by Bernardino Lanino. The 4th chapel houses a Saint Michael by Guglielmo Caccia (Il Moncalvo). In the counterfaçade there are two watercolours (1545) depict a Virgin of Annunciation and Archangel Gabriel, attributed to Vigevanese Bernardino Ferrari. The 4th chapel on the left houses a Virgin with Child and Saints by the 16th-century Venetian school and a 15th-century fresco representing Saint Augustin.
Founded in 1145, now has Lombard-Gothic layout of the hall churches, typical of Lomellina. Houses works attributed to Giovanni Battista Crespi (il Cerano). The main altar has a fresco depicting a Glory of Angels-Musicians, attributed to Cerano.
Sant'Albino, Mortara, one of the Christian «mother-churches» of the 5th century Lomellina, re-used by Charlemagne as a burial ground for the numerous soldiers who fell in the battle between the Lombard and the Frank armies, on October 12, 773. Among the casualties there were also two paladins of Charlemagne's, Amelius of Alvernia and Amicus from Beyre, whose death inspired a lot of French chansons de geste. In 774 the famous abbot Alkwin Albin added a canonical college to the Church. During the Middle Ages Sant'Albino was a compulsory halting-piace for the pìlgrims going from Britain and France to Rome. The architectural style developed from an original mingling of the Romanesque style, clearly recognizable in the apse, with the Renaissance style, to be found in the façade and in the nave. Against the southern side of the portico of the façade, is a building, perhaps a part of the ancient monastery. Beside the church, there are the ruins of the cloister, a brick open gallery with wooden architraves and with a 14th-century Gothic window decorated with rural motives. In the interior, on the right wall, are three frescoes painted by Giovanni da Milano in 1410 and representing Abbot St Anthony, The Baptism of Jesus, Enthroned Virgin with Saints Albin, Jacob, St. Augustine and Donor. Another fresco, by an unknown painter working during the first half of the 15th century, can be seen under the triptych, representing St. Laurentius with the symbol of his martyrdom in his hand. Next to this fresco are located some visible marks carved in the bricks by the pilgrims to remember their passage: the most ancient readable date is the year 1100. Another anonymous fresco is on the left part of the presbytery and represents a Virgin with Child and Saints;
Monumental Cemetery of Mortara

Notable people 
Paolo Patrucchi, footballer

References

External links
 Town website 

Cities and towns in Lombardy
1706 establishments in the Holy Roman Empire